George William Eve,  (1855-1914) was an English etcher, who designed bookplates and also several important British stamps. He was an authority on heraldry, a member of the Heralds' College, a Fellow of the Royal Society of Painter-Etchers and Engravers and a member of the Art Workers' Guild. When the Painter-Etchers and Engravers required a new diploma, it was Eve who was chosen from amongst their ranks to create it.

Given his background, it is not surprising that most of Eve's work was armorial in nature and black on white. Only later in life, in conjunction with Mr F.G. House, did he begin to experiment with more pictorial forms, but he died before this could be developed very far. In addition to the bookplates and stamps mentioned below, Eve designed a number of invitations to important civic events, material for the Welsh Investiture, shields and gesso decorations for the Earl of Mar and Kellie's Alloa House, Clackmannanshire, and many other items. On his death, Eve left a widow, Mary Ellen, and one son.

Bookplates
Eve was a noted bookplate designer, when that was a more important form than it is now. His designs were shown at the annual exhibitions of the Ex Libris Society (formed 1891, disbanded 1908) and he designed the royal bookplates for the library at Windsor Castle. He also designed a large number of bookplates for private clients.

Royal bookplates

Stamps
As a bookplate designer, Eve was a natural choice to design the frame of a number of British stamps. He did so for the first British postage due stamp, in around 1912-13, which he did in a style similar to that of a bookplate with the central area blank. He also designed the frame for the British Post Office Savings Bank receipt stamp and the low value definitive stamps of King George V for which his "pillar" and "wreath" designs were used.

Other works by George Eve

Publications
Decorative heraldry: A practical handbook of its artistic treatment. London, 1897. (Second edition, George Bell & Sons, London, 1908.)
Heraldry as art: an account of its development and practice, chiefly in England. B.T. Batsford, London, 1907.

References

External links

1855 births
1914 deaths
British designers
Eve
Heraldists